Wimpole Estate is a large estate containing Wimpole Hall, a country house located within the civil parish of Wimpole, Cambridgeshire, England, about  southwest of Cambridge. The house, begun in 1640, and its  of parkland and farmland are owned by the National Trust. The estate is regularly open to the public and received over 335,000 visitors in 2019. Wimpole is the largest house in Cambridgeshire.

History

Sited close to the great Roman road, Ermine Street, Wimpole was listed in the Domesday Book of 1086. At that time there was a moated manor house set in a small  deer-park. Situated to the north and south of this were three medieval villages: Bennall End, Thresham End and Green End.

The estate was held by the Chicheley family for over 250 years, beginning in 1428 with Henry Chichele who was Archbishop of Canterbury. The last of this family to hold the house was the politician Thomas Chicheley, who was responsible for the "new" house that was completed in 1650. Chicheley established the "formal gardens and architectural landscape". He enjoyed the house for 36 years until, weighed down by financial problems, he was forced to sell to Sir John Cutler. In 1689, Sir John gave it as a marriage settlement to his daughter Elizabeth and her husband Charles Robartes, 2nd Earl of Radnor. Lord Radnor extended the formal gardens and dug out fishponds. On the death of Elizabeth in 1697, without an heir, the estate passed to Edmund Boulter, nephew of Sir John Cutler. In 1710 it was in the possession of John Holles, 1st Duke of Newcastle-upon-Tyne, who left it to his daughter Lady Henrietta Cavendish Holles upon his death the following year. Upon Henrietta's marriage, in 1713, it became the possession of her husband Edward Harley, 2nd Earl of Oxford and Earl Mortimer. In 1740, Edward sold Wimpole to Philip Yorke, Earl of Hardwicke, in order to pay off his debts. The Earls of Hardwicke held it until it passed into the hands of Thomas Agar-Robartes, 6th Viscount Clifden, and then his son, Francis Agar-Robartes, 7th Viscount Clifden who, in 1930, departed to Lanhydrock upon the death of his father.

On 27 October 1843, Queen Victoria and Prince Albert visited the hall. They listened to speeches by local politicians including the Earl of Hardwicke, and dinner was served for 26 people. A ball was held in the evening. On 28 October 1843, Her Majesty visited the farm in the morning before departing for London.

In 1938, Capt. George Bambridge and his wife, Elsie, daughter of Rudyard Kipling, purchased it after having been tenants since 1932. They used the inheritance left to them by her father, and the royalties from his books, for the long-needed refurbishment of the house and grounds. During the War, for instance, the house had no running water nor electricity.  During her time at Wimpole Hall, Elsie was known to become irritated by members of the public gathering too close to the house for picnics, so much so, she once returned to the offending couple's property and had her own picnic on their lawn.

Over the centuries many notable architects have worked on it, including James Gibbs (between 1713 and 1730), Henry Flitcroft (around 1749), John Soane (1790s), and H. E. Kendall (1840s). There are decorative schemes by the painter James Thornhill (1721).

Carved marble busts of the Roman emperors Trajan and Galba were returned to Wimpole in 2014 and placed on the original wooden plinths which had been carved for them by Rattee and Kett in around 1860.

Interior gallery

The grounds
Wimpole Hall's grounds, enclosed in 1302, were laid out and modified by landscape designers such as George London and Henry Wise (1693–1705), Charles Bridgeman (1720s), Robert Greening (1740s), "Capability" Brown (1767), and Humphry Repton (1801–1809).

Bridgeman's formal grand avenue sweeps away from the south front of the house for two and a half miles, in contrast with the remainder of the park which was "naturalised" by Capability Brown. The North Park is particularly attractive with its belts of woodland, gentle rolling hills with individual trees and clumps of trees. The central feature of the North Park is the Gothic Tower and the restored lakes in the valley below. In the grounds are a chain of lakes (1695–1767), St Andrew's church (1749), Wimpole's Folly (the false Gothic Tower; 1768), a home farm (1792), a walled garden (18th century), and a stable block (1851). The "Dutch Garden" beneath the hall was established in 1980 with the rest of the garden completed based upon the mid-19th century parterre.

Listed buildings
The Wimpole Park Estate contains a number of listed buildings and structures. Wimpole Hall, a neo-classical building, is Grade I listed, and the estate itself is Grade I listed on the Register of Historic Parks and Gardens. The entrance gates and piers at the west entrance to the hall are listed Grade II, and the stable block is listed Grade II*.

In the gardens, a group of five vases and a sculptural group of Samson and Philistine are listed Grade II, as are the steps to the west of the hall and the wall and railings to the south. On the edge of the ornamental gardens the Ha-ha to the north west and to the north are both listed Grade II. The Wimpole's Folly castle on the estate is listed Grade II*.

The walled garden and the gardener's cottage on the north side of the walled garden are both listed Grade II, as is the game larder to the north east of the hall.

Community use
Like many other estates managed by the National Trust, a range of organised events and less formal access arrangements now use Wimpole Park. In 2013, a national partnership between the Trust and parkrun led to the establishment of a free, weekly timed  run around the park, with over 200 participants every Saturday morning.

In December 2019, the National Trust farm hosted the trial of a robot, known as Tom, that maps weeds with absolute precision. After the trial, Wimpole Estate expressed their intention to use the battery-powered prototype during the growing season.

In November 2020 there was a break-in at Wimpole Hall and twelve items, including vases and busts, were stolen.

Gallery

References

Sources

External links

 Wimpole Hall information at the National Trust
 Gardens Guide information
 Wimpole Estate Parkrun

Country houses in Cambridgeshire
Gardens by Capability Brown
Geography of Cambridgeshire
Grade I listed buildings in Cambridgeshire
Grade II listed buildings in Cambridgeshire
Grade II* listed buildings in Cambridgeshire
Grade I listed houses
Grade I listed parks and gardens in Cambridgeshire
Historic house museums in Cambridgeshire
James Gibbs buildings
John Soane buildings
National Trust properties in Cambridgeshire
Rudyard Kipling
Tourist attractions in Cambridgeshire
Yorke family
Estate